Terence Percival Hanney (19 January 1889 – 30 November 1964) was an English football player and manager.

Hanney was part of the gold medal-winning Great Britain team in the 1912 Olympic football competition in Stockholm. Due to an injury he suffered in the quarter-final match (which Britain won 7–0 against Hungary), Hanney he missed the 4–2 victory over Denmark in the final.

He commenced his career with Wokingham Town before moving to Reading. In 1913 he turned professional and switched for a fee of £1,250 to Manchester City, for whom he played 78 matches. Hanney guested for Brentford in the London Combination during the First World War. Having served in the Royal Berkshires before the war, Hanney held the rank of sergeant in the Football Battalion and was wounded in the face and neck by shrapnel at Delville Wood in July 1916. Later he played two seasons for Coventry City. After this he returned to Reading, where he finished his Football League career in the Third Division and then moved back into non-league football with Northfleet.

From 1924 later he coached VfB Stuttgart, winning the regional championship of Württemberg-Baden in 1927, the first title for the club. In 1927-28 he coached FC Wacker München, taking the club to the semi-finals of the German Championship.

After returning to England he became a publican.

Career statistics

Honours 
Brentford
 London Combination: 1918–19

References

1889 births
1964 deaths
People from Bradfield, Berkshire
Sportspeople from Reading, Berkshire
English footballers
England amateur international footballers
Footballers at the 1912 Summer Olympics
Olympic footballers of Great Britain
Military personnel from Berkshire
English Olympic medallists
Olympic gold medallists for Great Britain
Olympic medalists in football
Medalists at the 1912 Summer Olympics
Association football defenders
Wokingham Town F.C. players
Reading F.C. players
Manchester City F.C. players
Coventry City F.C. players
Northfleet United F.C. players
English Football League players
Brentford F.C. wartime guest players
English football managers
VfB Stuttgart managers
British Army personnel of World War I
Royal Berkshire Regiment soldiers
Middlesex Regiment soldiers
Reading F.C. non-playing staff
English expatriate football managers
English expatriate sportspeople in Germany
Expatriate football managers in Germany
Footballers from Berkshire